Rud Ab District may refer to:
 Rud Ab District (Kerman Province)
 Rud Ab District (Razavi Khorasan Province)